The Hibiscus and Bays Local Board is one of the 21 local boards of the Auckland Council. It is one of two boards overseen by the council's Albany Ward councillors. The board consists of eight members elected at large.

The board's area is divided into the Hibiscus Coast subdivision and the East Coast Bays subdivision, the latter of which stretches as far south as Campbells Bay. The board area also includes Tiritiri Matangi Island, off the end of the Whangaparaoa Peninsula.

Demographics

Hibiscus and Bays Local Board Area had a population of 104,010 at the 2018 New Zealand census, an increase of 14,181 people (15.8%) since the 2013 census, and an increase of 22,152 people (27.1%) since the 2006 census. There were 36,681 households, comprising 50,619 males and 53,391 females, giving a sex ratio of 0.95 males per female. The median age was 41.2 years (compared with 37.4 years nationally), with 19,461 people (18.7%) aged under 15 years, 18,408 (17.7%) aged 15 to 29, 47,784 (45.9%) aged 30 to 64, and 18,357 (17.6%) aged 65 or older.

Ethnicities were 80.8% European/Pākehā, 6.5% Māori, 2.1% Pacific peoples, 16.0% Asian, and 2.7% other ethnicities. People may identify with more than one ethnicity.

The percentage of people born overseas was 40.2, compared with 27.1% nationally.

Although some people chose not to answer the census's question about religious affiliation, 52.4% had no religion, 37.2% were Christian, 0.1% had Māori religious beliefs, 1.0% were Hindu, 0.5% were Muslim, 1.0% were Buddhist and 1.7% had other religions.

Of those at least 15 years old, 23,295 (27.6%) people had a bachelor's or higher degree, and 9,828 (11.6%) people had no formal qualifications. The median income was $37,000, compared with $31,800 nationally. 20,388 people (24.1%) earned over $70,000 compared to 17.2% nationally. The employment status of those at least 15 was that 42,024 (49.7%) people were employed full-time, 12,990 (15.4%) were part-time, and 2,487 (2.9%) were unemployed.

2022–2025 term
The current board members, elected in the 2022 local body elections, in election order:
Gary Brown, Coast People, (10405 votes)
Alexis Poppelbaum, Backing the Bays, (9195 votes)
Julia Grace Parfitt, Backing the Bays, (8567 votes)
Leanne Willis, Coast People, (7925 votes)
Victoria Short, Independent Locals, (6635 votes)
Sam Mills, Coast People, (6016 votes)
Gregg Walden, Backing the Bays, (5794 votes)
Jake Law, Team Coast, (5618 votes)

2019–2022 term
Board members, elected in the 2019 local body elections, in election order:
Julia Parfitt, Backing the Bays, (8052 votes)
Janet Fitzgerald, Positively Penlink, (7569 votes)
Alexis Poppelbaum, Backing the Bays, (6935 votes)
Gary Brown, Coast People and Penlink First, (6827 votes)
Andy Dunn, Coast People and Penlink First, (6793 votes)
Leanne Willis, Coast People and Penlink First, (5790 votes)
Gary Holmes, Backing the Bays, (5723 votes)
Victoria Short, Independent, (5020 votes)

2016–2019 term
Board members, elected in the 2016 local body elections, in election order:
Julia Parfitt, People over Politics, (8481 votes)
Janet Fitzgerald, Positively Penlink, (7924 votes)
Mike Williamson, People and Penlink First, (7687 votes)
Vicki Watson, People and Penlink First, (6856 votes)
Caitlin Watson, People and Penlink First, (6508 votes)
David Cooper, People over Politics, (5986 votes)
Christina Bettany, (no affiliation), (5847 votes)
Gary Holmes, People over Politics, (5645 votes)

See also
 Penlink - a proposed bypass highway

References

Hibiscus and Bays
Local boards of the Auckland Region